The 2017 Mid-American Conference women's soccer tournament was the postseason women's soccer tournament for the Mid-American Conference held from October 29 through November 5, 2017. The quarterfinals were held at campus sites. The semifinals and finals took place at Dix Stadium in Kent, Ohio, home of the Kent State Golden Flashes, the highest remaining seed in the tournament following the quarterfinal matches. The eight-team single-elimination tournament will consist of three rounds based on seeding from regular season conference play. The Kent State Golden Flashes were the defending champions, but they were eliminated from the 2017 tournament with a 2–1 semifinal loss to the Bowling Green Falcons. The Toledo Rockets won the tournament with a 2–1 win in overtime over Bowling Green in the final. The title was the fifth for the Toledo women's soccer program and the first for head coach TJ Buchholz.

Bracket

Schedule

Quarterfinals

Semifinals

Final

Statistics

Goalscorers 

4 Goals
 Erica Hubert - Bowling Green

3 Goals
 Sophie Pohl - Toledo

2 Goals
 Rachel Winters - Bowling Green

1 Goal
 Allison Abbe - Ball State
 Mandy Arnzen - Ohio
 Carissima Cutrona - Buffalo
 Isa Echeverri - Toledo
 Julia Elvbo - Ball State
 Allie Ingham - Eastern Michigan
 Vital Kats - Kent State
 Hayden Pascoe - Kent State
 Regan Price - Toledo
 Lauren Roll - Ball State
 Alex Ruffer - Western Michigan
 Alena Sidwell - Toledo

See also 
 2017 MAC Men's Soccer Tournament

References 

Mid-American Conference Women's Soccer Tournament
2017 Mid-American Conference women's soccer season